The 130th Ohio Infantry Regiment, sometimes 130th Ohio Volunteer Infantry (or 130th OVI) was an infantry regiment in the Union Army during the American Civil War.  It was originally organized as the 1st Ohio National Guard.

Service
The 130th Ohio Infantry was organized in Sandusky, Ohio, and mustered in May 13, 1864, for 100 days service under the command of Colonel Charles B. Phillips.

The regiment was attached to 2nd Brigade, 3rd Division, X Corps, Army of the James.

The 130th Ohio Infantry mustered out of service at Toledo, Ohio, on September 22, 1864.

Detailed service
Performed guard duty at Johnson's Island, Sandusky Bay, until June 4. It then moved to Washington, D.C., June 4 and to Bermuda Hundred, Virginia, June 8.  Picket duty at Bermuda Hundred and at Point of Rocks until June 21. March to Deep Bottom June 21, and duty there until August 11. Duty in lines at Bermuda Hundred and at Fort Powhatan August 11 to September 16, 1864.

Ohio National Guard
Over 35,000 Ohio National Guardsmen were federalized and organized into regiments for 100 days service in May 1864. Shipped to the Eastern Theater, they were designed to be placed in "safe" rear areas to protect railroads and supply points, thereby freeing regular troops for Lt. Gen. Ulysses S. Grant’s push on the Confederate capital of Richmond, Virginia. As events transpired, many units found themselves in combat, stationed in the path of Confederate Gen. Jubal Early’s veteran Army of the Valley during its famed Valley Campaigns of 1864. Ohio Guard units met the battle-tested foe head on and helped blunt the Confederate offensive thereby saving Washington, D.C. from capture. Ohio National Guard units participated in the battles of Monacacy, Fort Stevens, Harpers Ferry, and in the siege of Petersburg.

Casualties
The regiment lost 23 men during service; 1 officer and 22 enlisted men, all due to disease.

Commanders
 Colonel Charles B. Phillips

Notable members
 Private Livingston Hopkins, Company C - cartoonist who became a major Australian cartoonist during the time of the Federation of Australia

See also

 List of Ohio Civil War units
 Ohio in the Civil War

References
 Dyer, Frederick H. A Compendium of the War of the Rebellion (Des Moines, IA:  Dyer Pub. Co.), 1908.
 Ohio Roster Commission. Official Roster of the Soldiers of the State of Ohio in the War on the Rebellion, 1861–1865, Compiled Under the Direction of the Roster Commission (Akron, OH: Werner Co.), 1886–1895.
 Reid, Whitelaw. Ohio in the War: Her Statesmen, Her Generals, and Soldiers (Cincinnati, OH: Moore, Wilstach, & Baldwin), 1868. 
Attribution

External links
 Ohio in the Civil War: 130th Ohio Volunteer Infantry by Larry Stevens

Military units and formations established in 1864
Military units and formations disestablished in 1864
1864 disestablishments in Ohio
Units and formations of the Union Army from Ohio
1864 establishments in Ohio